Hood Hill is a small peak on the western side of the Hambleton Hills in North Yorkshire. The hill is noted for being conically-shaped, and being part of the view westwards from Sutton Bank.

Description 
Kilburn Beck rises on its southern flank. The small valley between Roulston Scar and Hood Hill (on the eastern side of the hill), was carved by ice and meltwater streams during the Ice-Age. It is thought that both Hood Beck and Hood Grange (in the 12th century known as Hode), are named after the adjacent Hood Hill. The name derives from the Old English hōd - a hood-shaped hill.

The conical-shaped cap of Hood Hill is a layer of Coralline Oolite; an oolitic limestone which also makes up the cliffs of Boltby Scar, Roulston Scar and Whitestonecliff. It is thought that the top of the hill would have protruded above the ice sheet as a Nunatak. Hood Hill is part of the west-facing escarpment of the Hambleton Hills that overlooks the Vale of York. The area was afforested by the Forestry Commission in the 1950s.

It has been suggested that a stone stone on the top of the hill is one formerly used by druids, with some writers suggesting human sacrifice. There is evidence of dykes, trenches and other earthworks from the Romano-British period. Hood Castle, a motte and bailey structure, was believed yo have been built by Roger de Stuteville in the 12th century; a document records that Henry II sent 300 soldiers to Hood Castle to help rout bandits in the area around Hood Hill. A licence to crenellate was awarded in 1264, but it was last mentioned in 1322. The site is now a scheduled monument.

James Herriott, the noted veterinarian who was based in Thirsk, labelled the view from Sutton Bank across Gormire Lake and Hood Hill as the "finest in England".

Aircraft crashes 
There have been two aircraft crashes on the hill:
5 May 1943 - Halifax JD105 was returning from a bombing raid over Dortmund in the Second World War, crashing into the hill during thick fog, killing five of the eight crew. After the initial bombing run over Germany, one of the crew stated he felt ill, and so the pilot reduced height possibly due to suspected hypoxia in the crew member. Engine trouble was also thought to be an issue.
21 September 1954 - a Sabre (XD733) of No. 92 Squadron based at RAF Linton-on-Ouse crashed almost vertically into the hill.

A memorial to both crashes has been placed on the hill. In 2009, a report in the York Press stated that military souvenir hunters were using metal detectors to salvage equipment from the Sabre crash site. People were warned that the pilots remains are still on the hill, and that the site was protected by the Protection of Military Remains Act.

References

Sources

External links 
Sketch of Hood Hill by J. M. W. Turner

Mountains and hills of North Yorkshire
North York Moors